Chicken 225 is an Indian reserve of the Black Lake Denesuline First Nation in Saskatchewan. In the 2016 Canadian Census, it recorded a population of 0 living in 0 of its 0 total private dwellings.

Etymology

The three Chicken reserves were named after a Chief Chicken, early leader of the Black Lake band.

References

Indian reserves in Saskatchewan
Division No. 18, Saskatchewan